Kyle Beach (born January 13, 1990) is a Canadian former professional ice hockey player. Considered a top National Hockey League (NHL) prospect, he was selected by the Chicago Blackhawks in the first round of the 2008 NHL Entry Draft. Beach never played in the NHL, however, only spending time with minor league affiliates in the American Hockey League (AHL) from 2008 to 2014. In 2021, Beach alleged he was sexually assaulted by a Blackhawks coach during their 2010 Stanley Cup championship season and filed legal action against the team for failing to intervene.

Playing career
Beach is a power forward who plays a tough, physical game accompanied by offensive skill. After his first season in the Western Hockey League (WHL), he was named the league's Rookie of the Year. His aggressive play led to multiple concussions and a sports hernia while playing for the Everett Silvertips. After being named the 2006–07 WHL Rookie of the Year, Beach was projected to be a top five pick in the 2008 NHL Entry Draft. He was drafted 11th overall by the Chicago Blackhawks. Later in his WHL career, Beach bounced around, spending time with the Lethbridge Hurricanes and the Spokane Chiefs.

Beach made his professional debut with the Rockford IceHogs of the American Hockey League (AHL) at the end of the 2008–09 season. Until the start of the 2013–14 season, Beach had spent his entire professional career with the IceHogs. During the Blackhawks' 2010 Stanley Cup run, Beach was called up to the Blackhawks' practice squad. When HV71, of the Swedish Elite League ran into injury trouble, Beach joined the club for three weeks, appearing in seven games. On December 6, 2013, Beach was traded to the New York Rangers for Brandon Mashinter. He was assigned to the Rangers' AHL affiliate, the Hartford Wolf Pack, following the trade.

In August 2014, Beach signed a tryout contract with EC Salzburg through  the end of September.

After nine games with Salzburg in his second season with the club, Beach opted to terminate his contract and return to North America in signing a contract on November 25, 2015, with the Missouri Mavericks of the ECHL. After seven scoreless games with the club, Beach opted to rejoin the Austrian Hockey League with Graz 99ers on December 18, 2015.

In the 2016–17 season, Beach enjoyed his most productive season as a professional, compiling 30 goals and 45 points in 54 games with the 99ers. However, after a short playoff-run, his contract with the 99ers was not renewed, resulting in his release as a free agent.

On March 17, 2017, as a free agent, Beach continued his tenure in the EBEL, agreeing to a two-year contract with EC VSV.

On May 10, 2022, Beach announced his retirement.

Personal life
His younger brother is NHL referee Cody Beach, who was born August 8, 1992. Cody was drafted by the St. Louis Blues in the 5th round of the 2010 NHL Entry Draft, and played as a prospect of the Blues in the American Hockey League with the Chicago Wolves. His cousin is Rich Harden, a former Major League Baseball pitcher. As a child, his favorite player was Jarome Iginla.

Sexual assault allegations against former Blackhawks video coach

On May 13, 2021, an unnamed former player filed a lawsuit alleging a prolonged sexual assault at the hands of then-video coach Brad Aldrich during an off-ice incident during the Chicago Blackhawks' 2010 Stanley Cup championship run. A subsequent investigation focused on two players, one of whom was referred to as "John Doe 1".

According to the investigation, on May 23, 2010, Blackhawks executives held a meeting about the sexual assault claims and decided they would not address them until after the Stanley Cup Playoffs. The matter was not discussed again, and on June 14, 2010, five days after Chicago won the Stanley Cup, the Blackhawks human resources director gave Aldrich the option to resign or face termination if John Doe 1's claims turned out to be true. Aldrich chose to resign and was permitted to participate in postseason celebrations, according to the investigation findings.

In October 2021, Beach gave an interview on SportsCentre confirming that he was John Doe 1, and spoke about his experiences with the Blackhawks organization after the fact. Since his interview confirming his identity as John Doe 1, he has received an outpouring of support all across the world for the bravery he has shown, including tweets in support from Hayley Wickenheiser, Aly Raisman, Adam van Koeverden, and Robin Lehner.

On November 23, 2021, Beach's attorney, Susan Loggans, confirmed that Beach and the Chicago Blackhawks would agree to mediation of the lawsuit via a mutually agreed upon third-party mediator, after Loggans’ court motion requesting that the lawsuit be allowed to progress to the discovery stage was denied by a judge. Mediation was held on Wednesday, December 15, 2021.

Career statistics

Regular season and playoffs

International

References

External links
 

1990 births
Living people
Canadian expatriate ice hockey players in Austria
Canadian expatriate ice hockey players in Sweden
Canadian ice hockey centres
Chicago Blackhawks draft picks
DVTK Jegesmedvék players
EC Bad Tölz players
EC Red Bull Salzburg players
EC VSV players
Everett Silvertips players
Graz 99ers players
Hartford Wolf Pack players
HV71 players
Ice hockey people from British Columbia
Lethbridge Hurricanes players
Missouri Mavericks players
National Hockey League first-round draft picks
Rockford IceHogs (AHL) players
Spokane Chiefs players